Rear-Admiral Sir George Henry Baird, KCB (14 October 1871 – 22 October 1924) was a Royal Navy officer.

From 1916 to 1918, Baird was in command of HMS Ajax and took part in the Battle of Jutland as part of the 2nd Battle Squadron.

References 

1871 births
1924 deaths
Royal Navy rear admirals
Royal Navy personnel of World War I
Knights Commander of the Order of the Bath